Bridge Magazine was a British monthly magazine devoted to the game of contract bridge. It was the oldest such magazine having been established in 1926 by A. E. Manning Foster.

It was not published during World War II, so it had fewer issues than The Bridge World. The Bridge Plus, a monthly magazine that was published between 1999 and 2008, was incorporated into Bridge Magazine. The magazine changed its title to Bridge International in 1984, to Bridge in 1990 and back to Bridge Magazine in 1992.

In the June 2013 issue Mark Horton, the editor, announced that in future the magazine would only be published online because the paper version had been losing too much money.

In the December 2017 issue Horton said that the current issue might be the last. It had been planned to relaunch the title in January 2018 as a free magazine, but the owners had said that they still required convincing that there would be enough subscribers and that a satisfactory business model was in place. In January 2018 it relaunched as a free magazine under the title A New Bridge Magazine, with Horton remaining as the editor. It ceased publication after the February, 2020 issue.
A New Bridge Magazine became part of the Funbridge group which launched BeBRIDGE with Mark Horton as Editor.

See also
Bridge d'Italia
List of bridge books
List of bridge magazines

References

External links
  of Bridge Magazine

Contract bridge magazines
Magazines established in 1926
Magazines disestablished in 2020
Defunct magazines published in the United Kingdom
Monthly magazines published in the United Kingdom